"Your Eyes" is the 39th single by the Japanese boy band Arashi. It was released on June 6, 2012 by their record label J Storm. "Your Eyes" is the theme song for the drama Mikeneko Holmes no Suiri starring Arashi member Masaki Aiba. The single comes in two editions. The Regular Edition comes with the B-sides "voice" and "Hanabi" (花火) and the instrumental versions for both songs. The limited edition comes with a promotional video, the B-side "Kimi ga Iru Kara" (君がいるから), and a 16-page booklet. The song debuted at No. 1 on the Oricon weekly charts, selling 477,820 copies in its first week.

Track listing

References

2012 singles
Arashi songs
Japanese television drama theme songs
Oricon Weekly number-one singles
J Storm singles
2012 songs